Roditi is a surname. Notable people with the surname include:

Édouard Roditi (1910–1992), French-American poet, short-story writer and translator
Claudio Roditi (1946–2020), Brazilian jazz trumpeter
David Roditi (born 1973), Mexican tennis player
Nicholas Roditi (born 1945), British hedge fund manager